"Think It Over" is a 1958 rock & roll song written by Buddy Holly, Jerry Allison, and Norman Petty.

Think It Over may also refer to:

"Think It Over" (Cheryl Ladd song) (1978)
Think It Over (album), a 1978 album by Cissy Houston
"Think It Over" (Cissy Houston song), lead single from the album
"Think It Over" (Cars song) (1981)
Think It Over (film), a 2002 Greek film

See also
Thinking It Over (disambiguation)
"Think It All Over", 1969 single by Sandie Shaw